Solaster spectabilis is an extant species of starfish described in 2011, and indigenous to the waters surrounding the Aleutian Islands in the North Pacific Ocean.

References

Bibliography

spectabilis
Fauna of the Pacific Ocean
Animals described in 2011